Ram Shankar Misra was Professor of Comparative Religionin the Department of Philosophy, Banaras Hindu University.

Among his published books is The Integral Advaitism of Sri Aurobindo (first published in 1957), an important contribution to the philosophical teachings of Sri Aurobindo.

External links
Sabda Newsletter no.17, Dec 2000 (includes book review)

Sri Aurobindo
Writers from Varanasi
Banaras Hindu University alumni
Year of birth missing
Year of death missing